Vegastar is a French rock band from Orléans which formed in 2003. They broke up in 2015 and reunited briefly for a short tour in 2018.

Background
Vegastar formed as a project by members of the group Human Beat Box. They signed to a major label and released their debut album, Un Nouvel Orage, in 2005. "100e étage", from that album, reached number 17 in the French singles chart. They released their second album, Télévision, in 2008.

Vegastar announced their official disbanding in 2015 on the ten-year anniversary of Un Nouvel Orage'''s release, re-releasing the album with bonus tracks that year. They briefly reunited in 2018 to tour and release a new single, "Dorian".

 Discography Un Nouvel Orage (2005)Télévision'' (2008)

References

External links
photos

French nu metal musical groups
Musical groups established in 2003